"Lucky Charm" is a 1989 single by Suns of Light (as the Boys). The single was their follow up to their debut single, "Dial My Heart", and hit number one on the Hot Black Singles chart for one week.

References

1988 songs
1989 singles
Songs written by Babyface (musician)
Songs written by Daryl Simmons
Song recordings produced by Babyface (musician)
Song recordings produced by L.A. Reid
Motown singles